The 94th Infantry Division Memorial Highway is a name given to several U.S. highways:
 Route 94, in New Jersey
 NY 94, in New York